Mundakayam, is a town in Kanjirappally Taluk in the Kottayam District of Kerala. It is the doorway to the high ranges of southern Kerala, and is at the border of Kottayam and Idukki districts. The next nearest town, Kanjirappally, is  & Erumely is 12 km from Mundakayam. Mundakayam has rubber plantations, and greenery. The Manimala River runs through Mundakayam. It is located 48 km east of the district headquarters at Kottayam and 148 km from the state capital, Thiruvananthapuram. The name Mundakayam is said to be derived from the Mundi cranes that used to be seen along the Manimala River banks.

Economy
Mundakayam is a land of coffee, pepper, cocoa and natural rubber. The rubber plantations in India had originated from Mundakayam, which was introduced by J.J. Murphy around 1910. An All India Agricultural & Industrial Exhibition was held here in 1967 which was inaugurated by Hindi film maker Sunil Dutt.

Administration
Mundakayam is part of Poonjar Constituency for Kerala Legislative Assembly Elections and part of Pathanamthitta (Lok Sabha constituency) for Indian General Elections. Sebastian Kulathunkal (LDF, Kerala Congress) is the sitting MLA. Anto Antony of INC is the MP representing Mundakayam.

Transportation
Mundakayam is well connected to places like Kottayam, Changanacherry, Ernakulam, Kumily, Peerumedu, Kuttikkanam, Kattappana, Erumely, Panchalimedu, Parathanam and Koottikkal. N.H 183 from Kollam to Theni passes through Mundakayam. Both private and state-owned buses operate here from dawn to dusk. Mundakayam's private bus station at the heart of the city is one of the biggest bus stations in Central Kerala. A new KSRTC bus station at Puthenchantha is awaiting inauguration. Mundakayam is connected to major cities Kochi and Trivandrum by KURTC's AC Low Floor Services. Daily buses go from Mundakayam to Chennai and Bangalore. Volvo Multi Axle Services of Kallada, Green line, Atlas, Kerala lines to Chennai & Banglore are also available. A new bypass road is opened to free the town from traffic block.

Parathanam is a small village and it is 8 km from Mundakayam.

Sabarigiri International Airport
On 19 July 2017, the Kerala Government announced the construction of the 5th International Airport in Kerala, Sabarigiri International Airport at Cheruvally Estate of Harrisons Plantations at Erumely, situated at the Border of Kottayam District and Pathanamthitta district to facilitate the travel of Sabarimala pilgrims. The proposed project site Cheruvally Estate is just 15 km from Mundakayam.

Entertainment
Even though there are no shopping malls in Mundakayam, the town has a lot of shopping complexes. Athiyalil Plaza at the town centre being the biggest. Thannimoottil building, CSI Shopping Complex, CVM Arcade, Arafa Shopping Complex, Vismaya Hypermarket are some others. Mundakayam have 2 Film Theatres and a Multiplex. RD Cinemas started play in 3 screen on 10-5-2018 in Mattathil building Paiangana. The multiplex has one 4K and two 2K screens. The multiplex is owned by Film maker B Unnikrishnan. Reliance Trends started operating from 2020 in Mundakayam.

Education

Government Institutions

Financial Institutions

Major Religious Centres

Temples
Palakunnel Sree Dharmashasthave Temple koottickal
 Parthasarathy Temple, Mundakkayam
 Sree Subhramanya Swami Temple, Boyce estate, 35th mile
 Valliyamkavu Devi Temple, Paloorkkavu
 Sree Dharma Sastha Temple, Amaravathy
 Thalumkal Sree Mahadevi Temple, Koottickal
 Sree Cheruvally Devi Temple, Punchayayal
 Chotty Sreemahadeva Temple
 Murikumvayal Sree Maha Vishnu Temple, Murikumvayal
 Paschima devi Temple, Paschima

Churches

 St. Thomas Orthodox Church, Paingana, Mundakayam
 Mor Ignatius Alias III Malankara Jacobite Syriac Orthodox Church, Mundakayam
 Holy Trinity C.S.I Church, Mundakayam
 St Mary's Church, ( Roman Catholic - Latin Rite )  Mundakayam
 St Joseph's Church ( Roman Catholic - Syro Malankara Rite ), Mundakayam
 Our Lady of Dolours Forane Church,  ( Roman Catholic - Syro Malabar Rite ) Mundakayam
 Bethel Marthoma Church, Mundakayam
 John Paul Centre Church,( Roman Catholic - Syro Malabar Rite ), 31st Mile, Mundakayam
 Apostolic Oblates, 31st Mile, Mundakayam
 San Pio Capuchin Ashram, Mundakayam

Mosques

 Mundakayam Muslim Jama Ath Town Juma Masjid
 Masjidul Wafa
 Chotty Juma Masjid 
 Varickani Juma Masjid
 Masjid As-Salam, Paingana
 Salafi Masjid

Climate

Notable people

 Thilakan - Prominent Malayalam film actor - an Indian film and stage actor who has starred in over 200 Malayalam films
 Joseph Abraham - Athlete - won the 400m Hurdles Gold for India at 2010 Guangzhou Asian Games
Seema G. Nair - supporting actresses in Malayalam cinema and serials

Nearby places of interest

Nearest towns
 Kanjirapally 14 km
 Erumeli  12 km
 Erattupetta  26 km
 Pala  35 km
 Pathanamthitta  46 km
 Kottayam 54 km
 Thiruvalla  60 km
 Changanacherry  58 km
 Kumily  55 km
 Kattappana  58 km
 Manimala 29 km

Nearby taluks
 Kanjirappally 14 km
 Azhutha  24 km
 Vazhoor  28 km
 Ranni  30 km

Nearest airports
 Cochin International Airport  	105 km
 Trivandrum International Airport  155 km

Nearest railway stations
 Kottayam Railway Station  	51 km
 Changanacherry railway station  53 km
 Tiruvalla railway station  	56 km

See also
 T. F. Bourdillon, British planter, botanist and forest conservator who visited Mundakkayam in late 19th century
 Kottayam
 Kanjirappally
 Ponkunnam
 Kuttikkanam
 Koottikkal
 Yendayar
 Sabarigiri International Airport
 All India Consumer Price Index

References

Mundakayam Facebook page

Villages in Kottayam district